Range Renegades is a 1948 American Western film directed by Lambert Hillyer and written by Ronald Davidson and William Lively. The film stars Jimmy Wakely, Dub Taylor, Jennifer Holt, Riley Hill, Dennis Moore and John James. The film was released on June 6, 1948 by Monogram Pictures.

Plot

Cast              
Jimmy Wakely as Jimmy Wakely
Dub Taylor as Cannonball 
Jennifer Holt as Belle Morgan
Riley Hill as Larry Jordan
Dennis Moore as Burton 
John James as Kern 
Frank LaRue as Marshal Laramie Jordan
Steve Clark as Mr. Harper
Milburn Morante as Pop 
Bob Woodward as Strang

References

External links
 

1948 films
American Western (genre) films
1948 Western (genre) films
Monogram Pictures films
Films directed by Lambert Hillyer
American black-and-white films
1940s English-language films
1940s American films